This is an order of battle listing the Australian and Viet Cong forces involved in the Battle of Long Tan which occurred in Phuoc Tuy Province, South Vietnam on 18 August 1966.

Australian forces

1st Australian Task Force

Initial contact, 18 August 1966
 D Company, 6 RAR (Major Harry Smith) – 108 men (including a three-man New Zealand artillery Forward Observation party)
 In support:
1st Field Regiment, Royal Australian Artillery (Lieutenant Colonel Richmond Cubis)
 103rd Field Battery, RAA – 6 x 105 mm L5 Pack Howitzers
 105th Field Battery, RAA – 6 x 105 mm L5 Pack Howitzers
 161st Battery, Royal New Zealand Artillery – 6 x 105 mm L5 Pack Howitzers (Major Harry Honnor)
 A Battery, US 2/35th Artillery Battalion – 6 x 155 mm M109 self-propelled howitzers (Captain Glen Eure)
 No. 9 Squadron RAAF – 2 x UH-1B Iroquois helicopters (aerial resupply)
 3 x US F4 Phantoms (air support)
 Relief force consisting of:
 A Company, 6 RAR (Captain Charles Mollison) – mounted
 3 Troop, 1st APC Squadron (Lieutenant Adrian Roberts) – 10 x M113 armoured personnel carriers
 Headquarters B Company, 6 RAR and one platoon (Major Noel Ford) – on foot

Operation Smithfield, 19–22 August 1966
 6 RAR Battle Group (Lieutenant Colonel Colin Townsend)
 Headquarters 6th Battalion, Royal Australian Regiment
 A, B, C and D Company, 6 RAR
 D Company, 5th Battalion, Royal Australian Regiment
 In support:
1st APC Squadron (minus) – 2 x Troops of M113 armoured personnel carriers
 161st Reconnaissance Flight – Bell H-13 Sioux light observation helicopters
 No. 9 Squadron RAAF – UH-1B Iroquois helicopters

Viet Cong forces

5th Division
 Headquarters 5th Division (Colonel Nguyen Thanh Hong) – in total 1,500 to 2,500 men 
 275th Regiment (Senior Captain Nguyen Thoi Bung aka Ut Thoi) – 1,400 men (three battalions)
 D445 Provincial Mobile Battalion (Bui Quang Chanh aka Sau Chanh) – 350 men (at least two companies, including C4 weapons company)
 One regular North Vietnamese Army battalion – suspected
 Vo Thi Sau militia company – 80 personnel, mostly women (battlefield clearance and casualty evacuation)

The final evaluation of the forces confronting D Company, 6 RAR included those in depth and is based on post-battle estimates derived from battle analysis, intelligence reports, captured documents and the interrogation of captured Viet Cong personnel. Although initial estimates of the Viet Cong force ranged from several companies to a battalion, following the battle Australian intelligence assessed it as having totalled between 1,500 and 2,500 men, while 1,000 men were believed to have directly engaged D Company. During the battle the division's second main force regiment, 274th Regiment had likely been occupying a position north of Binh Ba astride Route 2 to ambush a squadron from US 11th Armored Cavalry Regiment which they anticipated would attempt to relieve 1 ATF. Allied intelligence later confirmed it subsequently moved west into the Hat Dich after the failure at Long Tan.

See also
 Assessment of the Battle of Long Tan
 Long Tan Cross

Notes
Footnotes

Citations

References

Orders of battle
Battles of the Vietnam War involving Australia
Battles of the Vietnam War involving New Zealand
Battles of the Vietnam War involving the United States
Battles involving Vietnam
History of Bà Rịa-Vũng Tàu Province